The Hessian Cultural Prize is an annual German culture prize awarded by the Government of Hesse. The prize was established in 1982. With a trophy of 60,000 German marks, now 45,000 Euro, it is currently the highest endowed culture prize in Germany.

Recipients 
 1982 – Eugen Kogon (political scientist); Thomas Michael Mayer (chairman, Georg Büchner Association)
 1983 – Karl Krolow (lyricist); Hans-Jürgen von Bose (composer); Ror Wolf (author)
 1984 – Bernard Schultze (painter); Albert Mangelsdorff (jazz trombonist)
 1986 – Karl Dedecius (translator);  (Hölderlin scholar)
 1987 – Volker Schlöndorff (film director); E. R. Nele (sculptor); Ev Grüger (painter)
 1988 – Gabriele Wohmann (author)
 1989 –  (film director); Judith Rosenbauer (actor)
 1990 – Horst Krüger (novelist); Egbert Strolka (Tänzer und Ballettmeister)
 1991 – Horst Antes (painter und sculptor); Helmut Burmeister (museum director);  (museum director)
 1992 – Eilke Brigitte Helm (physician); Marcel Ophüls (documentary director); Ensemble Modern
 1993 –  (philologist); F. K. Waechter (author); Heiner Goebbels (composer)
 1994 – Lucius Burckhardt and Annemarie Burckhardt (sociologists); Peter Urban (translator); Adelheid Hoffmann and Hans-Jürgen „Slu“ Slusallek (galerists)
 1995 – Margret Stuffmann (museum director); William Forsythe (choreographer);  (publicist)
 1996 –  (anglicist); Klappmaul Theater (youth theater company); Walter Boehlich (author and translator)
 1997 – Odo Marquard (philosopher); Anna Viebrock (scenic designer); Ute Gerhard (sociologist, gender studies)
 1998 – Wolf Singer (neuroscientist); Thomas Bayrle (painter); Mischka Popp and Thomas Bergmann (director)
 1999 – Jürgen Habermas (philosopher); Marcel Reich-Ranicki (literary critic); Siegfried Unseld (publisher)
 2000 – Barbara Klemm (photographer); Helga Fanderl (film director); José Luis Encarnação (information scientist)
 2002 – Tabea Zimmermann (violist); Hans Zender (composer and conductor); Internationales Musikinstitut Darmstadt
 2003 – Florian Illies (publicist); Nicolaus Schafhausen (curator); Til Schweiger (actor)
 2004 – Andrea Breth (film director); Jürgen Holtz (actor);  (dramaturge)
 2005 – no award
 2006 – Christine Schäfer (soprano); Christoph Prégardien (tenor); Lothar Zagrosek (conductor)
 2008 – Wolfgang Diefenbach (orchestra director); Albrecht Beutelspacher (mathematician); Kindertheaterbürooo Kassel (Stefan Becker, Günter Staniewski)
 2009 – Salomon Korn (Jewish community leader); Karl Lehmann (Cardinal);  (former Protestant church leader); Navid Kermani (author, Islam scholar) rejected: Fuat Sezgin (Islam scholar)
 2010 – Rebecca Horn (visual artist)
 2011 – Dieter Rams (designer); F. C. Gundlach (photographer);  (visual artist)
 2012 – Hilmar Hoffmann (former president of the Goethe-Institut)
 2013 – Wolf D. Prix (architect)
 2014 – Peter Härtling (author)
 2015 – Artistic directors of documenta I–XIII
 2016 – Andreas Scholl (countertenor) and Tamar Halperin (harpsichordist and pianist)
 2017 – Volker Mosbrugger (paleontologist) and Matthias Lutz-Bachmann (philosoph)
 2018 – Margareta Dillinger and Johnny Klinke (Tigerpalast Frankfurt); Regina Oehler–van Gemmeren (science journalist hr), Andreas Platthaus (journalist FAZ) and Heike Schmoll (political correspondent FAZ)
 2019 – Wolfgang Lorch and Andrea Wandel (Wandel Lorch Architekten, architects)
 2020 – Caricatura Museum Frankfurt and Caricatura Gallery in Kassel
 2021 – Sandra Ciesek and Mai Thi Nguyen-Kim

References

German culture
Culture of Hesse
Government of Hesse
1981 establishments in Germany
Awards established in 1981